Seeta aur Geeta is a 1972 Indian Hindi-language comedy-drama film, written by Salim–Javed (Salim Khan and Javed Akhtar) and directed by Ramesh Sippy. It stars Hema Malini, Dharmendra and Sanjeev Kumar in leading roles, and features music composed by R.D. Burman.

The story is about identical twins (played by Hema Malini) who are separated at birth and grow up with different temperaments. After they meet each other as adults, they swap places (like The Prince and the Pauper). The two sisters' partners in the movie are played by Dharmendra and Sanjeev Kumar, while Manorama plays the villainous aunt.

The theme of the film was inspired by Ram Aur Shyam (1967), which inspired Salim-Javed to write Seeta Aur Geeta. Ram Aur Shyam is itself a remake of the 1964 Telugu film Ramudu Bheemudu. The film subverted the formula by having the heroine eventually become the "hero" while the male lead is in a mostly supporting role. An earlier film with a similar theme was Muqabala (1942), starring Fearless Nadia.

The film became a major hit, both in India and abroad in the Soviet Union. Hema Malini won her only competitive Filmfare Best Actress Award of her career, while K. Vaikunth won the Filmfare Best Cinematographer Award. Malini was noted for the novelty of her role as Geeta, where she is rambunctious and sometimes violent.

The film was remade in other languages, which includes the Telugu film Ganga Manga (1973) and the Tamil film Vani Rani (1974), both starring Vanisri in the dual roles. Subsequent Hindi remakes of the story have been made, including Geeta Mera Naam starring Sadhana Shivdasani, Jaise Ko Taisa starring Jeetendra, ChaalBaaz starring Sridevi, Kishen Kanhaiya starring Anil Kapoor, Judwaa starring Salman Khan, Kuch Khatti Kuch Meethi starring Kajol, in the dual roles.

Plot

Seeta and Geeta (Hema Malini in a dual role) are twin girls who were separated at birth. Geeta, a feisty girl is raised in a poor neighborhood and is a street performer, while Seeta is raised by her cruel aunt Chachi and meek uncle. Chachi treats Seeta like a servant, despite the fact that the family is living off her late parents' money. Seeta's only consolation is her old grandmother, who is bound to a wheelchair.

One day, Seeta decides life is not worth living and runs away to commit suicide. She is saved but is mistaken for her identical twin Geeta and is taken to Geeta's home. Meanwhile, Seeta's aunt and uncle are frantically searching for her and find Geeta. They attempt to force Geeta to go with them but, using some of her clever tricks, she escapes them and the police who have been searching for her. She then meets Ravi (Sanjeev Kumar) and, though he also mistakes her for Seeta, she goes home with him. Ravi is surprised by this "Seeta" and the Seeta he had met previously. Geeta realizes the cruelty that Seeta has been living under and vows to teach her aunt a lesson.

Meanwhile, the real Seeta is living in Geeta's house. Her foster mother has attributed her new docile attitude to shock. Here, Seeta meets Raka (Dharmendra), Geeta's friend and fellow performer. Raka is also surprised by "Geeta's" sudden gentle nature and desire to do housework. When he tried to coax her into performing, she is unable to do so. Ravi meanwhile falls in love with Geeta. At home, Geeta begins to set everything on a proper course. She resumes control of the money and restores her grandmother to the head of the household, where she belongs. Raka begins to fall in love with Seeta. Trouble begins brewing when Chachi's brother Ranjeet comes to visit and sees the real Seeta in a marketplace. He follows her and discovers the truth, which leads to a showdown in the villains' den and then marriage.

Cast

Production
According to Salim Khan, one half of screenwriting duo Salim–Javed, the concept of Seeta Aur Geeta was inspired by the Dilip Kumar starrer Ram Aur Shyam (1967), but they altered the formula with twin female sisters. Seeta Aur Geeta subverted the formula by having the heroine Hema Malini eventually become the "hero" while male lead Dharmendra is in a mostly supporting role.

Ramesh Sippy initially wanted Nutan as Seeta and Geeta because he "saw the heroine as a mature woman with a child" but he was advised against casting a heroine who was "at a mature phase of her career when the hero, too, was getting along in age." The film was also offered to popular actress Mumtaz, who ironically starred in Ram Aur Shyam, but she refused the offer as she wasn't paid enough. Mumtaz stated in an interview that at the time, the film was offered to her, she was charging Rs 8-8.5 lakhs/film, but she was offered only Rs 2 lakhs for Seeta aur Geeta. So she had to refuse the film. According to Sippy, the film's budget cost .

Soundtrack

All the songs  were composed by Rahul Dev Burman and lyrics were penned by Anand Bakshi.

Reception

Box office
Domestically in India, the film grossed  in 1972.

Overseas in the Soviet Union, the film grossed 13.8million SUR (US$18.21million, 16.03crore) in 1976.

Worldwide, the film grossed crore (US$million).

In terms of footfalls, the film sold an estimated  tickets in India and 55.2million tickets in the Soviet Union, for an estimated total of million tickets sold worldwide.

Awards
20th Filmfare Awards

Series

Bohra Bros had made a television series based on this film which was aired on NDTV Imagine in 2009. Coincidentally Hema Malini did a similar series on same plot called Kamini Damini which was aired on Sahara One on 2004.

Notelist

References

External links
 

1972 films
1970s Hindi-language films 
 Films about twin sisters
1970s action comedy-drama films
Films directed by Ramesh Sippy
Twins in Indian films
Hindi films remade in other languages
Films with screenplays by Salim–Javed
Indian action comedy-drama films
Films scored by R. D. Burman
1970s Urdu-language films
Urdu films remade in other languages
1972 comedy films
1972 drama films
Urdu-language Indian films